Joseph-Hughes Fortier (December 19, 1877 – September 22, 1955) was a Canadian provincial politician. He was a Liberal member of the Legislative Assembly of Quebec for Beauce from 1921 to 1929.

References

1877 births
1955 deaths
People from Sainte-Marie, Quebec
Quebec Liberal Party MNAs